The 2006–07 NBA season was the Spurs' 40th season as a franchise, the 34th in San Antonio, and the 31st season in the NBA The Spurs had the second best team defensive rating and the fifth best offensive rating in the NBA.

In the playoffs, the Spurs defeated the Denver Nuggets in five games in the first round, then defeated the Phoenix Suns in six games in the Semifinals, and defeated the Utah Jazz in five games in the Conference Finals to advance to the NBA Finals for the fourth time in franchise history.

There, the Spurs faced off against the Cleveland Cavaliers, led by a young LeBron James, who were making their first ever NBA Finals appearance. The Spurs swept the Cavaliers in four games, winning their fourth NBA championship, with Tony Parker named Finals MVP, making him the first European-born player to win the award.

Draft picks

Roster

Regular season

Standings

Game log 

|- bgcolor="#ccffcc"
| 1
| November 2
| @ Dallas
| 
| Tony Parker (19)
| Tim Duncan (10)
| Manu Ginóbili (7)
| American Airlines Center20,416
| 1–0
|- bgcolor="#ffcccc"
| 2
| November 3
| Cleveland
| 
| Tim Duncan (25)
| Tim Duncan (12)
| Tony Parker, Tim Duncan(5)
| AT&T Center18,797
| 1–1
|- bgcolor="#ccffcc"
| 3
| November 5
| @ Toronto
| 
| Tim Duncan (26)
| Fabricio Oberto (9)
| Tim Duncan (4)
| Air Canada Centre18,098
| 2–1
|- bgcolor="#ccffcc"
| 4
| November 6
| @ New York
| 
| Tony Parker (24)
| Tim Duncan (8)
| Tony Parker (10)
| Madison Square Garden18,333
| 3–1
|- bgcolor="#ccffcc"
| 5
| November 8
| Phoenix
|  (OT)
| Tony Parker (29)
| Tim Duncan (14)
| Tim Duncan, Tony Parker (6)
| AT&T Center18,797
| 4-1
|- bgcolor="#ccffcc"
| 6
| November 11
| New York
| 
| Tony Parker (33)
| Tim Duncan (16)
| Tony Parker (6)
| AT&T Center18,797
| 5-1
|- bgcolor="#ccffcc"
| 7
| November 14
| @ Houston
| 
| Tim Duncan, Manu Ginobili (19)
| Tim Duncan (15)
| Tony Parker (5)
| Toyota Center18,289
| 6-1
|- bgcolor="#ffcccc"
| 8
| November 15
| Charlotte
|  (OT)
| Tony Parker (25)
| Tim Duncan (13)
| Manu Ginóbili (7)
| AT&T Center18,797
| 6-2
|- bgcolor="#ccffcc"
| 9
| November 17
| Chicago
| 
| Tim Duncan (21)
| Tim Duncan (11)
| Beno Udrih (9)
| AT&T Center18,797
| 7-2
|- bgcolor="#ccffcc"
| 10
| November 19
| @ Sacramento
| 
| Tim Duncan (35)
| Tim Duncan (14)
| Tony Parker (4)
| ARCO Arena17,317
| 8-2
|- bgcolor="#ccffcc"
| 11
| November 20
| @ Portland
| 
| Tim Duncan, Manu Ginóbili (25)
| Tim Duncan (6)
| Tim Duncan (5)
| Rose Garden Arena14,163
| 9-2
|- bgcolor="#ccffcc"
| 12
| November 22
| Miami
| 
| Tim Duncan (19)
| Tim Duncan, Brent Barry (6)
| Tony Parker (4)
| AT&T Center18,797
| 10-2
|- bgcolor="#ffcccc"
| 13
| November 24
| Dallas
| 
| Tim Duncan (29)
| Fabricio Oberto (11)
| Bruce Bowen, Tim Duncan (3)
| AT&T Center18,797
| 10-3
|- bgcolor="#ccffcc"
| 14
| November 26
| @ Seattle
| 
| Tony Parker (20)
| Tim Duncan (16)
| Tim Duncan (6)
| KeyArena15,483
| 11-3
|- bgcolor="#ffcccc"
| 15
| November 27
| @ Golden State
| 
| Tony Parker (28)
| Tim Duncan (16)
| Tony Parker (7)
| Oracle Arena17,078
| 11-4
|- bgcolor="#ffcccc"
| 16
| November 29
| @ Utah
| 
| Tim Duncan (21)
| Tim Duncan (10)
| Brent Barry, Tony Parker (5)
| EnergySolutions Arena19,089
| 11-5

|- bgcolor="#ccffcc"
| 17
| December 2
| Sacramento
| 
| Bruce Bowen (23)
| Tim Duncan (11)
| Tony Parker (8)
| AT&T Center18,797
| 12-5
|- bgcolor="#ccffcc"
| 18
| December 4
| Golden State
| 
| Brent Barry (18)
| Francisco Elson (9)
| Manu Ginóbili (9)
| AT&T Center18,797
| 13-5
|- bgcolor="#ccffcc"
| 19
| December 6
| @ Charlotte
| 
| Tim Duncan (25)
| Michael Finley, Francisco Elson (6)
| Manu Ginóbili, Tony Parker (5)
| Charlotte Bobcats Arena14,066
| 14-5
|- bgcolor="#ccffcc"
| 20
| December 8
| L. A. Clippers
| 
| Manu Ginóbili (22)
| Tim Duncan (10)
| Tony Parker (15)
| AT&T Center18,797
| 15-5
|- bgcolor="#ffcccc"
| 21
| December 10
| @ L. A. Lakers
| 
| Manu Ginóbili (23)
| Tim Duncan (13)
| Tony Parker (9)
| STAPLES Center18,997
| 15-6
|- bgcolor="#ccffcc"
| 22
| December 11
| @ L. A. Clippers
| 
| Brent Barry (24)
| Tim Duncan, Beno Udrih (5)
| Beno Udrih (7)
| STAPLES Center18,147
| 16-6
|- bgcolor="#ccffcc"
| 23
| December 13
| Minnesota
| 
| Tim Duncan (24)
| Francisco Elson (7)
| Tony Parker (6)
| AT&T Center18,362
| 17-6
|- bgcolor="#ccffcc"
| 24
| December 14
| @ New Orleans/Oklahoma City
| 
| Manu Ginóbili (24)
| Tim Duncan (9)
| Tony Parker (8)
| New Orleans Arena15,140
| 18-6
|- bgcolor="#ccffcc"
| 25
| December 16
| Philadelphia
| 
| Tony Parker (24)
| Tim Duncan, Manu Ginóbili (9)
| Tony Parker (8)
| AT&T Center18,797
| 19-6
|- bgcolor="#ccffcc"
| 26
| December 20
| Memphis
| 
| Tim Duncan (21)
| Tim Duncan (9)
| Tony Parker (10)
| AT&T Center18,797
| 20-6
|- bgcolor="#ffcccc"
| 27
| December 22
| Houston
| 
| Manu Ginóbili (23)
| Tim Duncan (11)
| Brent Barry, Tim Duncan (4)
| AT&T Center18,797
| 20-7
|- bgcolor="#ccffcc"
| 28
| December 23
| New Orleans/Oklahoma City
| 
| Tony Parker (19)
| Tony Parker (5)
| Jacque Vaughn (11)
| Ford Center19,164
| 21-7
|- bgcolor="#ffcccc"
| 29
| December 26
| Milwaukee
| 
| Tim Duncan (25)
| Tim Duncan (12)
| Tony Parker (10)
| AT&T Center18,797
| 21-8
|- bgcolor="#ccffcc"
| 30
| December 28
| Utah
| 
| Tony Parker (22)
| Tim Duncan (9)
| Manu Ginóbili, Jacque Vaughn, Tony Parker (3)
| AT&T Center18,797
| 22-8
|- bgcolor="#ccffcc"
| 31
| December 31
| Atlanta
| 
| Tony Parker (27)
| Matt Bonner, Tim Duncan (11)
| Tony Parker (5)
| AT&T Center18,797
| 23-8

|- bgcolor="#ffcccc"
| 32
| January 2
| @ Cleveland
| 
| Tony Parker (26)
| Tim Duncan (15)
| Manu Ginóbili, Tony Parker, Brent Barry (3)
| Quicken Loans Arena20,214
| 23–9
|- bgcolor="#ffcccc"
| 33
| January 3
| @ Minnesota
|  (OT)
| Manu Ginóbili (26)
| Tim Duncan (13)
| Tim Duncan (5)
| Target Center14,185
| 23–10
|- bgcolor="#ffcccc"
| 34
| January 5
| Dallas
| 
| Manu Ginóbili (25)
| Tim Duncan (7)
| Tim Duncan, Tony Parker (4)
| AT&T Center18,797
| 23–11
|- bgcolor="#ccffcc"
| 35
| January 7
| @ Memphis
| 
| Manu Ginóbili (34)
| Tim Duncan (9)
| Tim Duncan, Beno Udrih (6)
| FedEx Forum15,227
| 24–11
|- bgcolor="#ccffcc"
| 36
| January 9
| Portland
| 
| Tim Duncan (16)
| Tim Duncan (9)
| Beno Udrih (7)
| AT&T Center18,240
| 25–11
|- bgcolor="#ccffcc"
| 37
| January 10
| @ Denver
| 
| Tony Parker (26)
| Tim Duncan (13)
| Tony Parker (7)
| Pepsi Center16,486
| 26–11
|- bgcolor="#ccffcc"
| 38
| January 13
| Washington
| 
| Manu Ginóbili (19)
| Tim Duncan (11)
| Tony Parker (6)
| AT&T Center18,797
| 27–11
|- bgcolor="#ffcccc"
| 39
| January 15
| @ Chicago
| 
| Manu Ginóbili (22)
| Tim Duncan (16)
| Tim Duncan (4)
| United Center22,218
| 27–12
|- bgcolor="#ffcccc"
| 40
| January 17
| L. A. Lakers
| 
| Tim Duncan (26)
| Tim Duncan (9)
| Tony Parker (5)
| AT&T Center18,797
| 27–13
|- bgcolor="#ccffcc"
| 41
| January 19
| New Orleans/Oklahoma City
| 
| Tony Parker (23)
| Tim Duncan (16)
| Manu Ginóbili (6)
| AT&T Center17,153
| 28–13
|- bgcolor="#ccffcc"
| 42
| January 21
| @ Philadelphia
| 
| Brent Barry (23)
| Tim Duncan (15)
| Tony Parker (8)
| Wachovia Center14,883
| 29–13
|- bgcolor="#ccffcc"
| 43
| January 22
| @ Boston
| 
| Tim Duncan (21)
| Tim Duncan (9)
| Tim Duncan, Tony Parker (5)
| TD Banknorth Garden15,928
| 30–13
|- bgcolor="#ffcccc"
| 44
| January 24
| Houston
| 
| Tim Duncan (37)
| Tim Duncan (10)
| Brent Barry, Tony Parker (6)
| AT&T Center18,328
| 30–14
|- bgcolor="#ccffcc"
| 45
| January 26
| Memphis
| 
| Tim Duncan (26)
| Tim Duncan (13)
| Tony Parker (8)
| AT&T Center18,332
| 31–14
|- bgcolor="#ccffcc"
| 46
| January 28
| @ L. A. Lakers
| 
| Tim Duncan (21)
| Tim Duncan (14)
| Tim Duncan (9)
| AT&T Center18,997
| 32–14
|- bgcolor="#ffcccc"
| 47
| January 31
| @ Utah
| 
| Tony Parker (27)
| Tim Duncan (12)
| Tony Parker (6)
| EnergySolutions Arena19,911
| 32–15

|- bgcolor="#ffcccc"
| 48
| February 1
| @ Phoenix
| 
| Manu Ginóbili (32)
| Tim Duncan (18)
| Tim Duncan (4)
| US Airways Center18,422
| 32–16
|- bgcolor="#ccffcc"
| 49
| February 7
| @ Washington
| 
| Tim Duncan, Tony Parker (20)
| Francisco Elson (8)
| Tony Parker (6)
| Verizon Center20,173
| 33–16
|- bgcolor="#ffcccc"
| 50
| February 9
| @ Orlando
| 
| Tim Duncan (24)
| Tim Duncan (16)
| Tony Parker (7)
| Amway Arena17,451
| 33–17
|- bgcolor="#ffcccc"
| 51
| February 11
| @ Miami
| 
| Manu Ginóbili (26)
| Tim Duncan (11)
| Tony Parker (5)
| AmericanAirlines Arena20,210
| 33–18
|- bgcolor="#ccffcc"
| 52
| February 13
| @ New Jersey
| 
| Tim Duncan (21)
| Tim Duncan (8)
| Jacque Vaughn (5)
| Continental Airlines Arena 14,936
| 34–18
|- bgcolor="#ccffcc"
| 53
| February 14
| @ Detroit
| 
| Tim Duncan (23)
| Francisco Elson (18)
| Tony Parker (8)
| The Palace of Auburn Hills 22,076
| 35–18
|- align="center"
|colspan="9" bgcolor="#bbcaff"|All-Star Break
|- bgcolor="#ccffcc"
| 54
| February 20
| Denver
| 
| Tony Parker (17)
| Francisco Elson (8)
| Tony Parker (5)
| AT&T Center 18,586
| 36–18
|- bgcolor="#ccffcc"
| 55
| February 21
| @ Atlanta
| 
| Manu Ginóbili (40)
| Tim Duncan (9)
| Jacque Vaughn (6)
| Philips Arena 15,565
| 37–18
|- bgcolor="#ccffcc"
| 56
| February 24
| Seattle
| 
| Tony Parker (21)
| Tim Duncan (15)
| Manu Ginóbili (7)
| AT&T Center 18,797
| 38–18
|- bgcolor="#ccffcc"
| 57
| February 26
| Seattle
| 
| Tony Parker (27)
| Tim Duncan (16)
| Tony Parker (9)
| AT&T Center18,563
| 39–18

|- bgcolor="#ccffcc"
| 58
| March 2
| Orlando
| 
| Manu Ginóbili (31)
| Tim Duncan (10)
| Manu Ginóbili (5)
| AT&T Center18,797
| 40–18
|- bgcolor="#ccffcc"
| 59
| March 3
| @ Houston
| 
| Tim Duncan (26)
| Francisco Elson (8)
| Manu Ginóbili, Jacque Vaughn (6)
| Toyota Center18,364
| 41–18
|- bgcolor="#ccffcc"
| 60
| March 5
| @ L. A. Clippers
| 
| Manu Ginóbili (16)
| Tim Duncan (12)
| Jacque Vaughn (6)
| STAPLES Center18,655
| 42–18
|- bgcolor="#ccffcc"
| 61
| March 6
| @ Portland
| 
| Tim Duncan (24)
| Tim Duncan (8)
| Michael Finley (5)
| Rose Garden Arena15,911
| 43–18
|- bgcolor="#ccffcc"
| 62
| March 8
| @ Sacramento
| 
| Manu Ginóbili (31)
| Tim Duncan (13)
| Tony Parker (5)
| ARCO Arena17,317
| 44–18
|- bgcolor="#ccffcc"
| 63
| March 10
| New Jersey
| 
| Tony Parker (19)
| Tim Duncan (13)
| Tony Parker (6)
| AT&T Center18,797
| 45–18
|- bgcolor="#ccffcc"
| 64
| March 13
| L. A. Clippers
| 
| Tony Parker (25)
| Tim Duncan (9)
| Jacque Vaughn (5)
| AT&T Center18,797
| 46–18
|- bgcolor="#ffcccc"
| 65
| March 15
| @ Milwaukee
| 
| Brent Barry (20)
| Tim Duncan (13)
| Tony Parker (8)
| Bradley Center13,917
| 46–19
|- bgcolor="#ffcccc"
| 66
| March 17
| @ Boston
| 
| Tony Parker (30)
| Tim Duncan (16)
| Manu Ginóbili (6)
| AT&T Center18,797
| 46–20
|- bgcolor="#ccffcc"
| 67
| March 21
| Indiana
| 
| Tim Duncan (27)
| Matt Bonner (9)
| Manu Ginóbili (5)
| AT&T Center18,580
| 47–20
|- bgcolor="#ccffcc"
| 68
| March 23
| Detroit
| 
| Tony Parker (22)
| Tim Duncan (14)
| Tony Parker (7)
| AT&T Center18,797
| 48–20
|- bgcolor="#ccffcc"
| 69
| March 25
| @ Seattle
| 
| Manu Ginóbili (19)
| Tim Duncan (10)
| Tony Parker (7)
| KeyArena16,409
| 49–20
|- bgcolor="#ccffcc"
| 70
| March 26
| @ Golden State
| 
| Tony Parker, Tim Duncan, Michael Finley (20)
| Francisco Elson (9)
| Tony Parker (9)
| Oracle Arena18,207
| 50–20
|- bgcolor="#ccffcc"
| 71
| March 28
| New Orleans
| 
| Tim Duncan (31)
| Bruce Bowen (9)
| Manu Ginóbili (7)
| AT&T Center18,334
| 51–20
|- bgcolor="#ccffcc"
| 72
| March 30
| Utah
| 
| Manu Ginóbili (25)
| Tim Duncan (14)
| Tony Parker (11)
| AT&T Center18,797
| 52–20

|- bgcolor="#ffcccc"
| 73
| April 1
| @ Indiana
| 
| Tony Parker (22)
| Tim Duncan (12)
| Tony Parker (7)
| Conseco Fieldhouse13,447
| 52–21
|- bgcolor="#ccffcc"
| 74
| April 3
| Seattle
| 
| Bruce Bowen (18)
| Fabricio Oberto (10)
| Tim Duncan (7)
| AT&T Center18,583
| 53–21
|- bgcolor="#ccffcc"
| 75
| April 5
| Phoenix
| 
| Tony Parker (35)
| Tim Duncan, Michael Finley, Francisco Elson (10)
| Tim Duncan (5)
| AT&T Center18,797
| 54–21
|- bgcolor="#ccffcc"
| 76
| April 7
| Golden State
| 
| Tim Duncan (28)
| Tim Duncan (15)
| Manu Ginóbili Tony Parker (7)
| AT&T Center18,797
| 55–21
|- bgcolor="#ccffcc"
| 77
| April 9
| Portland
| 
| Tony Parker (30)
| Tony Parker, Matt Bonner, Fabricio Oberto (5)
| Jacque Vaughn (5)
| AT&T Center17,852
| 56–21
|- bgcolor="#ccffcc"
| 78
| April 11
| Sacramento
| 
| Tim Duncan (26)
| Tim Duncan (13)
| Tony Parker (8)
| AT&T Center18,797
| 57–21
|- bgcolor="#ccffcc"
| 79
| April 13
| @ Minnesota
| 
| Manu Ginóbili (21)
| Tim Duncan (10)
| Brent Barry, Jacque Vaughn (4)
| Target Center19,356
| 58–21
|- bgcolor="#ffcccc"
| 80
| April 15
|  @ Dallas
| 
| Tony Parker (23)
| Tim Duncan, Francisco Elson (7)
| Tim Duncan (6)
| American Airlines Center20,444
| 58–22
|- bgcolor="#ffcccc"
| 81
| April 16
|  @ Memphis
| 
| James White, Michael Finley (17)
| Jackie Butler, Matt Bonner (10)
| Beno Udrih (9)
| FedEx Forum13,345
| 58–23
|- bgcolor="#ffcccc"
| 82
| April 18
| Denver
| 
| Beno Udrih (13)
| Jackie Butler (9)
| Brent Barry, Beno Udrih (3)
| AT&T Center18,797
| 58–24

Record vs. opponents

Player stats

Regular season

* Statistics include only games with the Spurs

Playoffs

Playoffs

|- align="center" bgcolor="#ffcccc"
| 1
| April 24
| Denver
| L 89–95
| Tony Parker (19)
| Tim Duncan (10)
| Tony Parker (8)
| AT&T Center18,797
| 0–1
|- align="center" bgcolor="#ccffcc"
| 2
| April 27
| Denver
| W 97–88
| Tim Duncan (22)
| Fabricio Oberto (10)
| Tony Parker (6)
| AT&T Center18,797
| 1–1
|- align="center" bgcolor="#ccffcc"
| 3
| April 30
| @ Denver
| W 96–91
| Tony Parker (21)
| Tim Duncan (13)
| Tony Parker (6)
| Pepsi Center19,951
| 2–1
|- align="center" bgcolor="#ccffcc"
| 4
| May 2
| @ Denver
| W 96–89
| Tim Duncan (22)
| Tim Duncan (11)
| Duncan, Ginóbili (6)
| Pepsi Center19,644
| 3–1
|- align="center" bgcolor="#ccffcc"
| 5
| May 4
| Denver
| W 93–78
| Michael Finley (26)
| Tim Duncan (12)
| Tony Parker (10)
| AT&T Center18,797
| 4–1
|-

|- align="center" bgcolor="#ccffcc"
| 1
| May 6
| @ Phoenix
| W 111–106
| Tim Duncan (33)
| Tim Duncan (16)
| Tony Parker (8)
| US Airways Center18,422
| 1–0
|- align="center" bgcolor="#ffcccc"
| 2
| May 8
| @ Phoenix
| L 81–101
| Tim Duncan (29)
| Tim Duncan (11)
| Manu Ginóbili (5)
| US Airways Center18,422
| 1–1
|- align="center" bgcolor="#ccffcc"
| 3
| May 12
| Phoenix
| W 108–101
| Tim Duncan (33)
| Tim Duncan (19)
| Tony Parker (5)
| AT&T Center18,797
| 2–1
|- align="center" bgcolor="#ffcccc"
| 4
| May 14
| Phoenix
| L 98–104
| Tony Parker (23)
| Tim Duncan (11)
| Tony Parker (7)
| AT&T Center18,797
| 2–2
|- align="center" bgcolor="#ccffcc"
| 5
| May 16
| @ Phoenix
| W 88–85
| Manu Ginóbili (26)
| Tim Duncan (12)
| Tony Parker (5)
| US Airways Center18,422
| 3–2
|- align="center" bgcolor="#ccffcc"
| 6
| May 18
| Phoenix
| W 114–106
| Manu Ginóbili (33)
| Tim Duncan (13)
| Parker, Ginóbili (6)
| AT&T Center18,797
| 4–2
|-

|- align="center" bgcolor="#ccffcc"
| 1
| May 20
| Utah
| W 108–100
| Tim Duncan (27)
| Tim Duncan (10)
| Manu Ginóbili (10)
| AT&T Center18,300
| 1–0
|- align="center" bgcolor="#ccffcc"
| 2
| May 22
| Utah
| W 105–96
| Tim Duncan (26)
| Tim Duncan (14)
| Tony Parker (14)
| AT&T Center18,797
| 2–0
|- align="center" bgcolor="#ffcccc"
| 3
| May 26
| @ Utah
| L 83–109
| Tony Parker (25)
| Tim Duncan (8)
| Tony Parker (7)
| EnergySolutions Arena19,911
| 2–1
|- align="center" bgcolor="#ccffcc"
| 4
| May 28
| @ Utah
| W 91–79
| Manu Ginóbili (22)
| Fabricio Oberto (11)
| Jacque Vaughn (4)
| EnergySolutions Arena19,911
| 3–1
|- align="center" bgcolor="#ccffcc"
| 5
| May 30
| Utah
| W 109–84
| Duncan, Parker (21)
| Fabricio Oberto (10)
| Jacque Vaughn (6)
| AT&T Center18,797
| 4–1
|-

|- align="center" bgcolor="#ccffcc"
| 1
| June 7
| Cleveland
| W 85–76
| Tony Parker (27)
| Tim Duncan (13)
| Tony Parker (7)
| AT&T Center18,797
| 1–0
|- align="center" bgcolor="#ccffcc"
| 2
| June 10
| Cleveland
| W 103–92
| Tony Parker (30)
| Duncan, Horry (9)
| Tim Duncan (8)
| AT&T Center18,797
| 2–0
|- align="center" bgcolor="#ccffcc"
| 3
| June 12
| @ Cleveland
| W 75–72
| Tony Parker (17)
| Bowen, Duncan (9)
| Manu Ginóbili (5)
| Quicken Loans Arena20,562
| 3–0
|- align="center" bgcolor="#ccffcc"
| 4
| June 14
| @ Cleveland
| W 83–82
| Manu Ginóbili (27)
| Tim Duncan (15)
| three players tied (3)
| Quicken Loans Arena20,562
| 4–0
|-

NBA Finals

Game 1 
LeBron James and the Cleveland Cavaliers entered the 2007 Finals as newcomers. Game 1 was the first NBA Finals appearance in franchise history, and the first for each of its players (other than reserve point guard Eric Snow). However, the San Antonio Spurs had been to the Finals in three of the past eight seasons, winning a championship each time. With solid performances by Tim Duncan, Tony Parker, and Manu Ginóbili, the Spurs won the series opener in convincing fashion, limiting LeBron James to 14 points on 4–16 shooting.

Game 2 
The Spurs took a stranglehold on momentum in Game 2. The Spurs big three overwhelmed the Cavs and the Spurs led by as many as 29 points in the third quarter. They absolutely dominated game during first 3 quarters and played show-time basketball. A furious 25–6 rally by Cleveland in the final quarter wasn't enough as the Spurs took a 2–0 lead in the series.

Game 3 
Rookie Daniel Gibson started Game 3 in place of the injured Larry Hughes but scored a series-low 2 points on 1–10 shooting. As a team the Cavs shot only .367 but out-rebounded the Spurs 48–41. Zydrunas Ilgauskas had a 2006–07 season high 18 rebounds. On the game's final play, LeBron James missed a potential game-tying 29-foot 3-pointer (which he contested as a foul on Bruce Bowen).

Game 3 was the lowest-scoring Finals game since 1955, with Tim Duncan of the Spurs having his lowest scoring game in his NBA Finals career, with 14 points.

Game 4 
San Antonio started out strong through the first three quarters, leading by as many as 11.  Cleveland would stage a rally near the end of the third quarter and the first five minutes of the fourth, scoring 14 consecutive points to take its first second-half lead of the series.  However, the Spurs would stage a 12–3 rally of their own to retake the lead and win the series in a 4–0 sweep.

Award winners
Tony Parker, NBA Finals Most Valuable Player Award
Tim Duncan, All-NBA First Team
Tim Duncan, NBA All-Defensive First Team
Bruce Bowen, NBA All-Defensive First Team

References

 San Antonio Spurs on Database Basketball
 San Antonio Spurs on Basketball Reference

 

San Antonio Spurs seasons
NBA championship seasons
Western Conference (NBA) championship seasons
San Antonio
San Antonio
San Antonio